Liu Haidong (Chinese: 刘海东; Pinyin: Liú Hǎidōng; born 28 February 1995) is a Chinese footballer.

Club career
Liu Haidong started his football career when he was promoted to Guangzhou Evergrande's first team for the 2014 season. He made his debut for the club on 13 February 2014 against Guizhou Renhe in the 2014 Chinese FA Super Cup. His league debut came on 3 May 2014 against Shanghai Shenxin in a 1-0 away win. On 8 November 2014, he suffered a cruciate ligament rupture in the first training section after Fabio Cannavaro became the new manager of the club. He recovered from injury and was included in Guangzhou Evergrande's reserve squad in the summer of 2016.
In March 2017, Liu loaned to China League Two side Heilongjiang Lava Spring.
In March 2018, Liu loaned to China League Two side Hainan Boying.

Career statistics

Honours

Club
Guangzhou Evergrande
 Chinese Super League: 2014

References

External links
 

1995 births
Living people
Footballers from Shenyang
Chinese footballers
Guangzhou F.C. players
Heilongjiang Ice City F.C. players
Chinese Super League players
Association football defenders